Marcin Oles (born 1973 in Sosnowiec, Poland) is a jazz and free improvisation bass player, composer and record producer. He is the twin brother of Bartlomiej Oles.

Since his first recording in 2000 he continuously (with his brother Bartlomiej) cooperated and performed with musicians such as Theo Jörgensmann, David Murray, William Parker, Herb Robertson, Ken Vandermark, Hamid Drake, Chris Speed, Erik Friedlander a.o.

In 2003 Marcin Oles became a founding member of the Trio Oles Jörgensmann Oles with his brother Bartlomiej and German clarinet-player Theo Jörgensmann. The last album of this Trio, titled Directions was voted by internet jazz magazine "Diapazon" from Poland as "The Best Recording Of The Year 2005".

He won the individual prize for bass player and drummer at The International Contest Jazz Juniors 99 in Krakow-Poland (1999).  He also won the best double bass player of Jazz Nad Odra in Wroclaw-Poland (1999)

Discography

As leader
 Gray Days with Adam Pieronczyk (Not Two, 2001)
 Mikro Muzik with Mikolaj Trzaska (Kilogram, 2002)
 Plays Music of Bacewicz, Kisielewski, Komsta, Lutoslawski, Penderecki with Mahall, Tiberian, Oles (Not Two, 2002)
 La Sketch Up with Mikolaj Trzaska (Kilogram, 2003)
 Ornette On Bass (Not Two, 2003)
 Miniatures with Theo Jorgensmann & Bartlomiej Oles (Not Two, 2003)
 Abstract with Andrzej Przybielski & Bartlomiej Oles (Not Two, 2005)
 Directions with Bartlomiej Oles (Fenommedia, 2005)
 Chamber Quintet with Bartlomiej Oles (Fenommedia, 2005)
 Walk Songs with Chris Speed, Simon Nabatov, Bartlomiej Oles (Fenommedia, 2006)
 Live in Poznan 2006 with Theo Jorgensmann & Bartlomiej Oles (Fenommedia, 2007)
 Suite for Trio + with Mikolaj Trzaska & Jean-Luc Cappozzo (Fenommedia, 2005)
 Other Voices Other Scenes with Bartlomiej Oles (Fenommedia, 2010)

As sideman
 David Murray, Circles: Live in Cracow (Not Two, 2003)
 Bartlomiej Oles & Werner, Shadows (Fenommedia, 2006)
 Herb Robertson & Bartlomiej Oles, Live at Alchemia (Not Two, 2007)
 Ken Vandermark, Ideas (Not Two, 2005)

External links 
Oles-Oles homepage
all about jazz
Jazzreview.com

1973 births
Living people
Jazz double-bassists
Polish composers
Polish jazz musicians
Free improvising musicians
Polish double-bassists
Male double-bassists
21st-century double-bassists
21st-century male musicians
Male jazz musicians